Yakabaşı can refer to:

 Yakabaşı, Abana
 Yakabaşı, Gümüşova